Events from the year 1555 in India.

Events 
 June Francisco Barreto takes up the position of viceroy in Goa, Portuguese India
 Muhammad Adil Shah reign as fourth ruler of the Sur dynasty ends (since 1554)

Births 
 Keshavdas, Sanskrit scholar and Hindi poet, author of Rasik Priya, is born in Orchha (dies 1617)

Deaths 
 16 June – Pedro Mascarenhas, viceroy of Portuguese India dies (born 1470)
 5 November – Hemu (Hemu Vikramaditya), Hindu emperor of north India.

See also 

 Timeline of Indian history

References